Year 990 (CMXC) was a common year starting on Wednesday (link will display the full calendar) of the Julian calendar.

Events 
 By place 

 Europe 
 Al-Mansur, de facto ruler of Al-Andalus, conquers the Castle of Montemor-o-Velho (modern Portugal), expanding the Umayyad Caliphate of Córdoba. 
 The city of Lund, Sweden is founded, during the reign of the Danish king Sweyn Forkbeard (approximate date).

 Africa 
 The Ghana Empire takes the Berber town of Aoudaghost (modern Mauritania) as the West African nation makes further gains. 
 Construction of the Al-Hakim Mosque by orders of the Fatimid vizier Gawar Al-Siqilli begins in Cairo (modern Egypt).

 By topic 
 Religion 
 June – The Pax Ecclesiae, an edict by the Catholic Church, is promulgated. Held at three synods in different parts of southern and central France (at Charroux, Narbonne and Puy), it attempts to outlaw acts of war against non-combatants and the clergy.

Births 
 November 11 – Gisela of Swabia, Holy Roman Empress (d. 1043)
 Adamo Abate, Italian Benedictine abbot (approximate date)
 Al-Qadi Abu Ya'la, Arab Hanbali scholar and jurist (d. 1066)
 Bi Sheng, Chinese inventor of movable type printing (d. 1051)
 Chananel ben Chushiel, Tunisian Jewish rabbi (d. 1053)
 Conrad II (the Elder), Holy Roman Emperor  (d. 1039)
 Edmund II (Ironside), king of England (d. 1016)
 Grigor Magistros, Armenian prince (d. 1058)
 John Scotus, bishop of Mecklenburg (d. 1066)
 John Vladimir, Serbian prince (approximate date)
 Kálfr Árnason, Norwegian chieftain (approximate date)
 Mieszko II, king of Poland (approximate date)
 Nissim ben Jacob, Tunisian Jewish rabbi (d. 1062)
 Theobald of Dorat, French monk and saint (d. 1070)
 Theodoric II, margrave of Lower Lusatia (d. 1034)
 Thietmar, margrave of the Saxon Ostmark (d. 1030)
 Tughril, sultan of the Seljuk Empire (d. 1063)
 Yaakov ben Yakar, German Jewish rabbi (d. 1064)
 Zhang Xian, Chinese poet and writer (d. 1078)

Deaths 
 March 15 – Siegfried I (the Older), German nobleman
 March 25 – Nicodemus of Mammola, Italian monk and saint
 April 23 – Ekkehard II (the Courtier), Swiss monk and abbot
 June 15 – Theophanu, Holy Roman Empress and regent
 July 26 – Fujiwara no Kaneie, Japanese statesman (b. 929)
 September 16 – Folcuin, Frankish abbot of Saint Bertin
 December 10 – Folcmar (Poppo), bishop of Utrecht
 Al-Saghani, Persian astronomer and historian of science
 Al-Tamimi, Arab writer and physician (approximate date)
 Dunash ben Labrat, Arab Jewish commentator (b. 920)
 Indra Pala, ruler of the Pala Dynasty (India) (b. 960)
 Kiyohara no Motosuke, Japanese nobleman (b. 908)
 Nazif ibn Yumn, Melkite Christian mathematician and translator
 Oliba Cabreta, count of Cerdanya and Besalú (Spain)
 Qarghuyah, Hamdanid administrator and governor
 Sahl ben Matzliah, Jewish philosopher (b. 910)
 Urard Mac Coise, Irish poet (Ollamh Érenn)

References